"Happier" is a song by American DJ Marshmello and British indie pop band Bastille.  Written by Marshmello, Bastille frontman Dan Smith, & Steve Mac, and produced by the former, it was released by Astralwerks on August 16, 2018. It reached number two on both the UK Singles Chart and the Billboard Hot 100 and is the highest-charting single for Marshmello in both the UK and the US (eventually tying with "Come & Go" with Juice WRLD on the latter). It is also Bastille's highest-charting single as well on both charts surpassing their 2013 single "Pompeii"'s number five peak on the Hot 100 and tying at its number two peak on the UK chart. It also logged 27 weeks in the top ten of the Hot 100. The song also currently holds the record for most weeks spent at number one on the US Dance/Electronic Songs chart, with 69 weeks as of January 2020. The song was ranked number 33 on the Billboard Hot 100 decade-end chart of the 2010s, becoming the highest-ranking song to not top the Billboard Hot 100 weekly chart.

The song was performed live at the 2018 MTV Europe Music Awards along with another Marshmello song, "Friends" (with Anne-Marie).

Background
Dan Smith, frontman of Bastille, had originally written 'Happier' 
for Justin Bieber but the band ultimately decided to keep it for themselves. "We've been having a great time writing for other artists in and amongst making our Bastille albums and mixtapes," Smith told NME. "Last year we wrote a song called 'Happier' and everyone got really excited about it so we thought it would be good as a collaboration. We had a really interesting time getting to work on it with Marshmello who managed to find some euphoria in a pretty melancholy, direct song. It's always good to step into somebody else's world for a minute and we're excited to be a part of it."

Composition
"Happier" is an upbeat pop song that draws elements from pop rock. Lyrically, the song tells "the tale of a love that's over before one party wants to accept it." Billboards Kat Bein opined that it "sounds a little more like his radio-forward hits."

In May 2019, Russian trance producer Arty filed a lawsuit against Marshmello for copyright infringement, citing that "Happier" stole song elements from Arty's remix of the song "I Lived" by OneRepublic. According to the suit, it is possible that Marshmello had become familiar with Arty's remix, released in 2014, and had used song elements in his then-upcoming song "Happier," which did not debut until 2015. Alongside Marshmello, other defendants in the case include Dan Smith, Steve Mac, and various music publishing companies. Arty is represented by attorney Richard Busch, who had previously represented the Marvin Gaye family in the "Blurred Lines" suit.

Music video
Three music videos were released to support the single. The initially released one was a simple lyric video. This was followed by a performance video featuring Marshmello playing various instruments and Dan Smith singing and dancing, both in different frames and only appearing in one at the end of the video. On September 24, 2018, Marshmello released the official music video through YouTube Premiere, starring Miranda Cosgrove as a teenager who has braces, along with Teala Dunn, Jordyn Jones and James Babson as the father. The music video focuses on Cosgrove's character. The color yellow and Marshmello's logo feature throughout the video, but neither he nor anyone from Bastille appear in the video. The video was directed by Mercedes Bryce Morgan and photographed by cinematographer Steve Gainer.

Synopsis
A shy, sensitive girl's birthday party is held, and she is very nervous until she gets her birthday present: a dog, a Golden Retriever puppy, on which she fits a bow. As she becomes a teenager, and the dog grows along with her, she joins a soccer team, and one of the captains pick her last. In the next scene is the team photo, and the girl was in the front; but the captains steal her place and she joins the back. When she smiles, her braces are seen, and she is made fun of for them. She then quits the team and plays with her dog at home, only to find her dog is ill. Months pass and the dog is still ill. The dog is taken to the vet; the vet has a private conversation with the girl's dad, to whom he reveals the dog's illness to be terminal. The girl's dad explains to his distraught daughter what will happen, then the dog is taken and is put down. Years pass, the girl grows up to have a daughter, who gets happy when her grandfather gifts her a similar Golden Retriever puppy for her birthday, much to her mother's tears of joy.

Track listingsDigital download"Happier" – 3:34Digital download – acoustic"Happier"  – 4:10CD single"Happier" – 3:34
"Happier"  – 2:38Digital download – remixes EP"Happier"  – 3:16
"Happier"  – 2:38
"Happier"  – 3:15
"Happier"  – 3:21Digital download – remixes (part 2) EP'
"Happier"  – 4:03
"Happier"  – 4:48
"Happier"  – 3:28
"Happier"  – 2:50
"Happier"  – 3:06
"Happier"  – 3:31

Credits and personnel
Credits adapted from Tidal.

 Marshmello – production, songwriting 
 Bastille – vocals, songwriting 
 Robin Florent – mixing assistance
 Scott Desmarais – mixing assistance
 Michelle Mancini – master engineering
 Chris Galland – mix engineering
 Manny Marroquin – mixing
 Steve Mac – vocal production

Charts

Weekly charts

Monthly charts

Year-end charts

Decade-end charts

Certifications

Awards

Release history

See also
 List of number-one songs of 2018 (Singapore)

References

External links
 
 

2018 singles
2018 songs
Bastille (band) songs
Marshmello songs
Astralwerks singles
Number-one singles in Singapore
Songs written by Dan Smith (singer)
Songs written by Marshmello
Songs written by Steve Mac
Songs involved in plagiarism controversies
Dance-pop songs